Charles Edmund de Trafford (21 May 1864 – 11 November 1951) was an English aristocrat and a first-class cricketer.

Early life

Charles de Trafford was born at Trafford Hall, Trafford Park, Stretford, the second son of Sir Humphrey de Trafford, 2nd Baronet and his wife Lady Annette Talbot. His father owned Old Trafford Cricket Ground. Charles was educated at Beaumont College.

Cricket

In 1884, at age 20, de Trafford joined the Lancashire County Cricket Club. He soon became known as a skilled cricketer and in 1885 joined Marylebone Cricket Club (MCC). In 1894 he moved to Leicestershire County Cricket Club as captain, a position in which he remained for 13 seasons. He is largely credited with making Leicestershire into a first-class club.

A man of great physical strength, de Trafford was an opening batsman and a big hitter who liked to attack from the first ball. He never wore batting gloves. For Leicestershire against the Australians in 1905, he made all the first 56 runs of the innings himself, and was out for 63 after a first-wicket partnership of 69, when his partner was 2 not out.

He captained MCC on the tour of New Zealand in 1906-07 after the original captain, Teddy Wynyard, returned home injured after the second match.

He made his highest first-class score in 1913 for Leicestershire against Derbyshire when he was 49 years old. After Leicestershire had been 11 for four on the first morning, he hit 137 in 120 minutes, and Leicestershire made 351 off 71 overs and went on to win by an innings on the second day.

Personal life

In 1881, his father, Sir Humphrey de Trafford purchased the Hothorpe Hall Estate in Northamptonshire (though near Theddingworth, Leicestershire), from the Cook family and presented it to Charles. During his time at Hothorpe, Charles de Trafford extended the Georgian Manor House and in 1892 built a Catholic Chapel there in memory of his brother Gilbert who had died in 1890.

On 15 October 1892, he married Lady Agnes Feilding, the daughter of Rudolph Feilding, 8th Earl of Denbigh. Their son Edmund Hubert de Trafford served with distinction in World War I, married the Hon. Cecilia Strickland and later emigrated to Malta. Edmund and Cecilia's daughter Elizabeth returned to England and married Admiral Arthur Francis Turner.

In 1893, de Trafford served as High Sheriff of Leicestershire and also as a Justice of the Peace. Lady Agnes died in 1921, and Charles continue to live at Hothorpe until 1928, when he moved to Sibbertoft. He died at Rothley on 11 November 1951, aged 87.

References

De Trafford, Charles
De Trafford, Charles
De Trafford, Charles
De Trafford, Charles
De Trafford, Charles
De Trafford, Charles
People from Rothley
Cricketers from Leicestershire
People from Stretford
High Sheriffs of Leicestershire
English cricketers of 1864 to 1889
English cricketers of 1890 to 1918
Free Foresters cricketers
Marylebone Cricket Club cricketers
London County cricketers
North v South cricketers
Gentlemen cricketers
Gentlemen of England cricketers
People from West Northamptonshire District
Charles
Younger sons of baronets
Lord Hawke's XI cricketers
C. I. Thornton's XI cricketers
Wembley Park cricketers
A. J. Webbe's XI cricketers